Highway 93 is a north–south route through the southeastern part of British Columbia, in the Regional District of East Kootenay and takes its number from U.S. Highway 93 that it connects with at the Canada–United States border.  It follows the Crowsnest Highway (Highway 3) and Highway 95 through Radium Hot Springs and to where it crosses the Continental Divide into Alberta at Vermilion Pass, where it continues as Alberta Highway 93.  The section between the Canada-U.S. border and the Crowsnest Highway is known as the Elko–Roosville Highway, the section between the Crowsnest Highway and Radium Hot Springs is known as the Kootenay–Columbia Highway, while the section east of Radium Hot Springs is known as the Banff–Windermere Parkway.

Route description

Highway 95 carries Highway 93 north for another  along the Kootenay River and the Columbia River passing through Wasa, Canal Flats, Fairmont Hot Springs and Invermere to Radium Hot Springs, where Highway 95 diverges north towards Golden.

After crossing the border, the highway continues for another  to meet the Trans-Canada Highway (Alberta Highway 1) near Castle Junction.

History

The Highway first opened in 1953 from the international border to Elko, on Highway 3, but it did not follow its current route from the border until 1958.  Before 1959, the Banff–Windermere Parkway, the segment of Highway 93 east of Radium Hot Springs, had a designation of Highway 1B, reflecting its connection to the Trans-Canada Highway within Alberta at Castle Junction.  In 1959, Highway 93 was extended from Elko along Highway 3 and Highway 95 to Radium Hot Springs, while Highway 1B and the Icefields Parkway (known as Highway 1A) were renumbered to their present designation.

Major intersections 
From south to north:

See also

 List of British Columbia provincial highways

References

Further reading

External links

093